Garisan (also Romanized as Garsīān, Garrīsān, and Gorrūsān) is a village in Koregah-e Gharbi Rural District, in the Central District of Khorramabad County, Lorestan Province, Iran. At the 2006 census, its population was 81, in 13 families.

References 

Towns and villages in Khorramabad County